Moosa Zameer was the Minister of Tourism of Maldives from 28 October 2015 to 11 November 2019. He served as the chairman of the Social Council of Maldives for the same duration. Moosa Zameer was also a member of the 17th Majlis from 2009 - 2014.

References

Living people
People from Malé
Maldivian politicians
Year of birth missing (living people)